Pietro Micca was the name of at least three ships of the Italian Navy and may refer to:

 , a cruiser launched in 1876 and discarded in 1893.
 , a  launched in 1917 and discarded in 1930.
 , a submarine launched in 1935 and sunk in 1943.

Italian Navy ship names